Sikhanyiso Ndlovu was a Zimbabwean politician who was Minister of Information and Publicity from 2007 to 2008. He was also a member of the ZANU-PF Politburo.

Political career
After serving as Deputy Minister of Education, Ndlovu was appointed as Minister of Information by President Robert Mugabe on February 6, 2007.

EU-Africa Summit
President Mugabe achieved a diplomatic coup in December 2007 when he attended a European Union-Africa summit despite a visa ban on Zimbabwean government officials, effective since 2001. At the summit, Ndlovu called Chancellor Angela Merkel a "Nazi remnant". Responding to Merkel's criticism of human rights abuses in Zimbabwe, Ndlovu told her to "shut up or ship out," saying Germany needed a head of state like Otto von Bismarck. By the time of the summit he was already placed on United States sanctions and European Union sanctions lists.

House of Assembly 
Ndlovu was nominated as ZANU-PF's candidate for the House of Assembly seat from Pelandaba-Mpopoma constituency in Bulawayo in the March 2008 parliamentary election. He launched his campaign by slaughtering a beast and giving away bicycles to some of the people who attended his rally at Nkulumane Primary School, an act that his critics described as a gimmick to buy votes. Milford Gwetu, an MP for the Movement for Democratic Change who was running for re-election in the same constituency as Ndlovu, died during the campaign, and as a result the election there was delayed. In the postponed election held on 27 June 2008 he was defeated by MDC candidate Samuel Sandla Khumalo.

Cholera outbreak
On December 12, 2008, a day after Mugabe claimed that the Zimbabwean government had defeated a cholera epidemic, Ndlovu accused the United Kingdom of causing the outbreak in a "racist" attack meant to cause genocide against the Zimbabwean people.

Dismissal
The Herald reported on January 3, 2009, that Ndlovu had been dismissed from the Cabinet earlier in the week, along with 11 other ministers, because he no longer held any seat in Parliament.

Death 
Ndlovu was admitted to the Intensive Care Unit (ICU) at Mater Dei Hospital in Bulawayo after he suffered a stroke. He had earlier suffered an Asthma attack. He died early in the morning on September 15, 2015. He was 78 years old.

References

Living people
1963 births
ZANU–PF politicians
Government ministers of Zimbabwe